The KTM 640 Adventure is a dual-sport motorcycle made by KTM from model years 1998 until 2007.

The bike featured a single cylinder engine, 21" front and 18" rear wheels and a large fuel tank as standard. It experienced a number of minor changes over its lifespan.

Models
In 1997 KTM introduced the 620 Adventure with a 609 cc engine. The bike received a new 625 cc engine for the 1998 model year and was renamed the 640 Adventure-R. 

For model year 2004 it experienced noticeable changes with a low front fender, twin front brake discs and the primary color changing from silver to orange.

Production ceased at the end of the 2007 model year after no further displacement changes.

References
Official KTM model information, archived 1 October 2004
Top-Speed article

External links
Official KTM model information

640
Off-road motorcycles
Motorcycles introduced in 1997